Ryan McCurdy (born 23 May 1991) is a professional footballer who plays as a centre-back.

Club career

Kingston FC
In 2012, McCurdy signed with Kingston FC in the Canadian Soccer League, and in 2013 featured in the CSL Championship final.

Kingston Clippers
In 2015 and 2016, McCurdy played for League1 Ontario side Kingston Clippers. In 2016, he made eight appearances for Kingston in league play.

Victoria Highlanders
In 2017, McCurdy captained PDL side Victoria Highlanders, making fourteen appearances.

Pacific FC
On 17 April 2019, McCurdy signed with Canadian Premier League side Pacific FC. On 29 April 2019, McCurdy made his professional debut for Pacific as a substitute in a 1–0 win over HFX Wanderers. He made a total of ten league appearances for Pacific that season. On 4 November 2019, the club announced it would not be offering McCurdy a new contract for the following season.

References

External links

1991 births
Living people
Association football defenders
Association footballers from Northern Ireland
Canadian soccer players
Association footballers from Belfast
Northern Ireland emigrants to Canada
Naturalized citizens of Canada
Algonquin College alumni
Vancouver Island University alumni
Kingston FC players
Victoria Highlanders players
Pacific FC players
Canadian Soccer League (1998–present) players
League1 Ontario players
USL League Two players
Canadian Premier League players
Kingston Clippers players